Kristopher "Kris" Crawford is an emergency room physician and entrepreneur. He has served as a Republican in the South Carolina House of Representatives from 2006 to 2014. Crawford represents District 63rd based in Florence, South Carolina. Currently, he serves as the President of Physicians Preferred Monitoring and regional medical director at EmCare.

Education
Crawford graduated from The Citadel in 1992 with a degree in Biology, and earned his M.D. from the Medical University of South Carolina in 2001. He completed a Family Medicine residency at McLeod Regional Medical Center between 2001 & 2004. He served on Governor Sanford's Task Force on Healthcare.

Personal life
Crawford is married to M. Rebecca Crawford and they have four children.

Medical career
After completing his residency, he started his private practice at Crawford Medical, LLC and also began working as an ER Staff Physician in Dillon, SC for McLeod Medical Center Dillon. He served at this position from 2004 to 2005 and joined Lake City Community Hospital in 2005 and Lake City Community Hospital in 2007, he simultaneously worked at these hospital until 2009. In 2010, he was named as the interim-medical director of Guardian Healthcare and again in 2011, he was named as regional medical director at EmCare, where is serving till date.

South Carolina House of Representatives

Crawford was elected to the South Carolina General Assembly in 2006. He serves on the Labor, Commerce and Industry and Rules committees.

Telemedicine reimbursement legislation
During his tenure, Crawford introduced South Carolina Telemedicine Reimbursement Act (SCMA), which authorized physicians and health care providers to ask for fee for the telemedicine services provided in a certain manner through phone, fax and electronic mail.

Midwifery issue

In 2013, Crawford introduced a bill that would change the way that midwives are licensed in South Carolina.  Currently regulated by the state Department of Health and Environmental Control (DHEC), "new legislation, house bill H. 3731, would move licensing and regulation of midwives from its current home at DHEC to the South Carolina Department of Labor, Licensing and Regulation (LLR), which handles all other medical professionals."  Crawford justified the bill as a safety measure.  The bill, which also would require an obstetrician to supervise all midwife-assisted deliveries, was opposed by a petition by 2,000 mothers and other citizens, because it would effectively ban home births.  Crawford said he "has no wish to ban home births" and, after opposition to his bill appeared, suggested that he could amend the bill before a vote on its passage.

Reaction
Republican Governor Nikki Haley issued a statement calling Crawford's remarks an "ignorant comment [that] in no way represents the people of South Carolina - and it's a shame that the views of a few end up damaging the image of our state as a whole."

Other works
Crawford introduced a bill, H.4795 to stop any unconstitutional spying by the National Security Agency. It barred the government to provide any support or assistance to federal agencies for collection of a person’s electronic data that can be used for warrantless spying. In 2014, he passed another bill that allowed legal use of cannabis oil for the treatment of epilepsy, only when a patient has a prescription or when he is participating in a clinical trial for the treatment of epilepsy.

Controversies

Tax case
In 2010, Crawford was charged with seven counts of failure to file state tax documents.   His defense was that his tax accountant had not told him of the failure to file his taxes.  After a mistrial due to a hung jury in April 2012, he was re-tried and convicted by a jury of four misdemeanors of willfully failing to file and pay his taxes, and fined US$10,000.  The newspaper, The State expressed dismay that Crawford's and other crimes by local politicians had not garnered the attention and opprobrium they deserved.

2012 Republican Party presidential primary
Crawford initially supported Governor Chris Christie of New Jersey, hoping to draft him for President of the United States in 2012, saying, "the country needs him".  Ultimately, when Christie chose not to run, Crawford endorsed and campaigned for former Speaker of the House of Representatives Newt Gingrich in the 2012 Republican Party presidential primary.

Gingrich won the South Carolina Republican presidential preference primary but lost to former Governor Mitt Romney of Massachusetts.

References

External links
 Official web page at South Carolina House of Representatives website
 Archived articles at The State newspaper website
 page on Ballotpedia

Living people
Republican Party members of the South Carolina House of Representatives
The Citadel, The Military College of South Carolina alumni
Medical University of South Carolina alumni
American emergency physicians
South Carolina politicians convicted of crimes
Year of birth missing (living people)